Exning Road Halt railway station served the village of Exning, Suffolk, England from 1922 to 1962 on the Cambridge to Mildenhall railway.

History 
The station opened on 20 November 1922 by the Great Eastern Railway. It was situated on the west side of Newmarket Road. The station closed to both passengers and goods traffic on 18 June 1962.

References

External links 

Disused railway stations in Suffolk
Former Great Eastern Railway stations
Railway stations in Great Britain opened in 1922
Railway stations in Great Britain closed in 1962
1922 establishments in England
1962 disestablishments in England